The Tarix Jabrix 2 is a 2009 Indonesian comedy film directed by Iqbal Rais and the sequel to the 2008 film The Tarix Jabrix, both of wich star The Changcuters band as the title gang. The film is produced by Chand Parwez Servia with Hanung Bramantyo as a co-producer. It was released theatrically on July 2, 2009 and the soundtrack was nominated at the Indonesian Movie Awards and Balinale. The Tarix Jabrix 2 was a box office success, selling 581,610 tickets and was included in the 10 best-selling 2009 films in Indonesia. It has sequel The Tarix Jabrix 3.

Synopsis 
The Tarix Jabrix Gang has graduated from the high school. Cacing suggested that The Tarix Jabrix move and study together in Jakarta. Initially, The Tarix Jabrix was so excited to enjoy the sensation of Jakarta. However, the condition made The Tarix Jabrix uneasy. Through the Cacing's idea, they sell motorbikes and buy cars. When they use the car to campus, their confidence is slightly lifted. Ciko and Coki now have crushes. So did Cacing. Their new association drags them into a typical capital city case, kidnapping. They also face problems from within, Mulder who falls into the arena of wild racing with his competitors.

Cast

Accolades

References

External links 
 
 

2009 films
Indonesian comedy films
2008 comedy films
2000s teen comedy films
Indonesian teen comedy films
Films set in Jakarta
Films shot in Indonesia
2000s Indonesian-language films
Films about students